Zane Michael Smith (born June 9, 1999) is an American professional stock car racing driver. He competes full-time in the NASCAR Craftsman Truck Series, driving the No. 38 Ford F-150 for Front Row Motorsports and part-time in the NASCAR Cup Series, driving the Nos. 36/38 Ford Mustangs for FRM. He is the 2022 NASCAR Camping World Truck Series champion.

Smith previously drove full-time in the Craftsman Truck Series for GMS Racing, finishing second in the championship in 2020 and 2021. He also placed runner-up in the 2018 ARCA Menards Series standings for MDM Motorsports. Part-time stints have come in the NASCAR Xfinity Series for JR Motorsports and Stadium Super Trucks.

Racing career

Early career
First racing BMX, Smith moved to go-kart racing in 2004 and won championships for five consecutive years before moving up to legends car racing. He raced super late models in 2015, recording victories in the World Series of Asphalt, Pro All Stars Series and the CARS Tour, as well as garnering a runner-up finish in the Snowball Derby.

ARCA
On the heels of his successes racing late models, Smith tested an ARCA Menards Series car with Mason Mitchell Motorsports at Daytona International Speedway in January 2016. A wake skating injury limited Smith's racing slate in early 2016, but he later returned for two ARCA races with Venturini Motorsports. In late summer 2016, Smith left his SLM team in hopes of finding more ARCA experience in 2017.

In late 2016, Smith signed with Venturini to drive all but two races of the 2017 ARCA Menards Series schedule in the organization's No. 55 entry. Noah Gragson was slated to fill the other two races, which Smith couldn't race due to age restrictions. Smith, going for Rookie of the Year honors, joined the same crew that led Dalton Sargeant to the award the previous year. He also drove a partial schedule in the ARCA Menards Series East, debuting in the series for Calabrese Motorsports at the beginning of 2017. He also replaced Ryan Partridge for the season opener of the ARCA West season after Partridge could not obtain a license in time. Smith was named to the 2017 NASCAR Next class in April 2017. The team and driver agreed to part ways in the middle of August, after eight top-tens in eleven races. Smith later signed on with MDM Motorsports for three races towards the end of the season. The races yielded two poles and as many runner-up finishes.

On November 6, 2017, Smith re-signed with MDM for the 2018 season to run full-time in their No. 41 Toyota. He scored his first win in the second race of the season, outlasting teammate Sheldon Creed and bested his three previous runner-up finishes. Two races later, Smith beat Joe Graf Jr. at Talladega Superspeedway in ARCA's closest-ever finish, where the sanctioning body had to use photos to determine who won the race because timing systems scored the margin of victory at .00 seconds. In the next race, Smith went three-wide with Chandler Smith (no relation) and lapped car Mike Basham to take the lead after the midway point of the race and later passed MDM teammate Chase Purdy for the win with less than ten laps to go. Smith secured the victory with the help of 2017 ARCA champion Austin Theriault, who was atop the spotters' box for the win at Toledo Speedway. Also in May 2018, it was announced that Smith for a second straight year returned to the NASCAR Next program. At a race at Salem Speedway late in the season, Smith and Michael Self got together multiple times, eventually causing Smith's radiator to quit working in the middle of the race. Smith returned to the track with a premeditated intention of payback, slowing down until Self passed and burying him in the outside wall. Smith later bragged about the incident in a MAVTV interview. ARCA fined him $5,000 and 100 points, a punishment many in the industry considered too lenient. Xfinity Series driver Scott Heckert worried about drivers' health if purposeful blunt-force collisions are allowed. At the end of the season, Smith was second in point standings, despite the penalty. He later said that he wasn't set on a full-time schedule at the beginning of the year, but ran well enough to sell sponsorships for the remainder of the schedule.

NASCAR Craftsman Truck Series
In June 2018, Smith announced his NASCAR Camping World Truck Series debut with Tricon Garage at Gateway Motorsports Park. The deal came together the week of the race, as Smith had to rush to get all of his licenses prepared in time.

Smith joined GMS Racing for the full 2020 NASCAR Craftsman Truck Series season. On August 7, he won his first career Truck Series race at Michigan when he passed leader Christian Eckes on the final lap in overtime. He scored his second win two weeks later at Dover after holding off Matt Crafton and Brett Moffitt on the final restart. Smith reached the final round as the only non-playoff race winner of the four remaining championship drivers, where he finished runner-up in the season finale at Phoenix and the standings to GMS teammate Sheldon Creed. In addition to NASCAR Rookie of the Year honors, he was voted the Truck Series' Most Popular Driver.

Smith returned to GMS Racing in 2021. On October 30, he won his third career NASCAR Truck Series race after Stewart Friesen spun Todd Gilliland in front of the field at Martinsville, the win locked Smith into the Championship race at Phoenix. In the season finale at Phoenix, Zane was passed with 8 laps to go and finished fifth in the race and second in points to eventual champion Ben Rhodes.

On November 30, 2021, Smith was announced as the driver of the Front Row Motorsports No. 38 truck in 2022. In the 2022 season, Smith scored his fourth career Truck Series win in the season opener at Daytona after holding off Ben Rhodes in overtime after nearly winning in regulation. Smith finished in second place at Las Vegas, but was disqualified after a post-race inspection found a lug nut violation. Smith finished fifth the next race at Atlanta. Zane got his second win of the season at Circuit of the Americas after Alex Bowman collided with front runners Stewart Friesen and Kyle Busch, Smith also won both stages. Following the 2022 CRC Brakleen 150 at Pocono Raceway, Smith clinched the regular season championship. On November 4, Smith claimed his first Truck Series championship after winning at Phoenix. It was also Front Row Motorsports' first NASCAR championship.

Smith began the 2023 season by winning at Daytona for the second year in a row.

NASCAR Xfinity Series

On December 18, 2018, it was announced that Smith would drive the No. 9 JR Motorsports entry in the Xfinity Series for eight races in 2019, most coming at short tracks. The deal came after an agreement for a full Truck Series season with GMS Racing did not materialize. On January 25, 2019, it was revealed that Smith would switch over to the No. 8 entry as Noah Gragson would take over the No. 9 entry.

In May 2021, Smith returned to the Xfinity Series as a substitute driver for Justin Haley, who was unavailable due to COVID-19 protocols, in the No. 11 of Kaulig Racing at Dover.

NASCAR Cup Series
On June 2, 2022, RFK Racing driver Chris Buescher tested positive for COVID-19 and missed the Cup Series race at Gateway. Smith was announced as the driver to replace Buescher. It was his first race in the Cup Series. He would finish on the lead lap in 17th after starting 32nd.

Other racing
On August 8, 2020, Smith made his Stadium Super Trucks debut at Road America, a day after he won the NASCAR Truck Series race at Michigan; Creed, a two-time SST champion, also competed. Smith finished fifth and sixth in the day's two races.

Smith and his teammate Harrison Burton won the 2023 IMSA Michelin Pilot Challenge event at Daytona International Speedway on January 27, 2023.

Motorsports career results

NASCAR
(key) (Bold – Pole position awarded by qualifying time. Italics – Pole position earned by points standings or practice time. * – Most laps led.)

Cup Series

Daytona 500

Xfinity Series

Craftsman Truck Series

 Season still in progress
 Ineligible for series points

K&N Pro Series East

ARCA Menards Series
(key) (Bold – Pole position awarded by qualifying time. Italics – Pole position earned by points standings or practice time. * – Most laps led.)

ARCA Menards Series West

Stadium Super Trucks
(key) (Bold – Pole position. Italics – Fastest qualifier. * – Most laps led.)

 Standings were not recorded by the series for the 2020 season

References

External links

 
 

Living people
1999 births
Racing drivers from California
NASCAR drivers
ARCA Menards Series drivers
Stadium Super Trucks drivers
Sportspeople from Huntington Beach, California
NASCAR Truck Series regular season champions
JR Motorsports drivers
RFK Racing drivers
NASCAR Truck Series champions
Michelin Pilot Challenge drivers